Isaac Cooper (born 7 January 2004) is an Australian swimmer. He competed in the men's 100 metre backstroke and in the heats of the 4x100 metre mixed medley relay at the 2020 Summer Olympics. 

Isaac competed in the 2022 FINA Short Course World Championships. He was cruelly denied a backstroke world short course swimming gold medal in bizarre circumstances after the final had to be re-run. He went on to achieve a World Record and Gold Medal in the 4 x50m Medley Relay.

He was sent home from the 2022 Commonwealth Games for disciplinary reasons related to the “use of medication”.

World records

Short course metres

 split 49.46 (backstroke leg); with Joshua Yong (breaststroke leg), Matthew Temple (butterfly leg), Kyle Chalmers (freestyle leg)

References

External links
 

2004 births
Living people
Australian male backstroke swimmers
Olympic swimmers of Australia
Swimmers at the 2020 Summer Olympics
Sportspeople from Bundaberg
Sportsmen from Queensland
Medalists at the 2020 Summer Olympics
Olympic bronze medalists in swimming
Olympic bronze medalists for Australia
World Aquatics Championships medalists in swimming
Medalists at the FINA World Swimming Championships (25 m)
21st-century Australian people